Club Deportivo Defensor Villa del Mar is a Peruvian football club, playing in the city of Lima, Peru. The club is the biggest of Villa El Salvador city, and one of the biggest in Lima Province. The club were founded 1972, playing in the Copa Perú, which is the third division of the Peruvian league.

History
The club have played at the second level of Peruvian football on five occasions, from 2002 Segunda División Peruana until 2006 Segunda División Peruana when was relegated to the Copa Perú.

Honours

National
Peruvian Segunda División: 0
Runner-up (1): 2002

See also
List of football clubs in Peru
Peruvian football league system

Football clubs in Peru
Association football clubs established in 1972